Wedlocked was an Australian sitcom that ran for 11 episodes in 1994 on the Seven Network. It was created by Andrew Knight and Doug MacLeod.

Cast
 Brandon Burke as Dr. Chris Gilchrist
 Dina Panozzo as Susie Abruzzo
 Richard Piper as Lex Dexter
 Kelly Sulikowski as Holly Abruzzo
 Paul Reardon as Ben Gilchrist
 Tony Barber as Tony Johnson
 Terry Gill as Ainslie Barton
 Robert Menzies as Carl
 Terrie Waddell as Julia

See also 
 List of Australian television series

References

External links
 

Australian television sitcoms
Seven Network original programming
1994 Australian television series debuts